The Western Literature Association (WLA) is a non-profit, scholarly association that promotes the study of the diverse literature and cultures of the North American West, past and present. Since its founding, the WLA has served to publish scholarship and promote work in the field; it has gathered together scholars, artists, environmentalists, and community leaders who value the West's literary and cultural contributions to American and world cultures; it has recognized those who have made a major contribution to western literature and western studies; and it has fostered student learning and career advancement in education. 

The Association for the Study of Literature and Environment (ASLE) was founded in 1992 at a special session of the Western Literature Association conference in Reno, Nevada, for the purpose of "sharing of facts, ideas, and texts concerning the study of literature and the environment."

The Association publishes Western American Literature: A Journal of Literary, Cultural, and Place Studies (since 1965) in partnership with the University of Nebraska Press. It considers itself "the leading peer-reviewed journal in the literary and cultural study of the North American West, defined broadly to include western Canada and northern Mexico".

List of WLA Presidents and Annual Conferences 
This is a list of people who have served as presidents of the organization and have hosted the annual conference.

References

External links 
 Western Literature Association official website
 Western American Literature Research, hosting links to the journal Western American Literature

1965 establishments in the United States
Arts organizations established in 1965
Literary societies